The Flo Hyman Memorial Award was conferred annually between 1987 and 2004 by the Women's Sports Foundation in Washington, D.C., United States, on the organization's National Girls and Women in Sports Day to the female sportsperson, irrespective of nationality or sport contested, adjudged to have capture[d] [best]...the dignity, spirit, and commitment to excellence of American indoor volleyballer Flo Hyman, an advocate for gender equality in sport and for the passage of Civil Rights Restoration Act of 1988 who died suddenly and unexpectedly in January 1986.  The award was given with respect both to athletic performance and to charitable activism, especially in the context of [increasing] sports opportunities for all girls and women.

List of winners

See also

 List of sports awards honoring women
 Arthur Ashe for Courage Award
 Laureus World Sports Awards

References

External links
Official site of the Women's Sports Foundation Awards

Sports awards honoring women
Women's sports in the United States
Awards established in 1987
Awards disestablished in 2004
Women's Sports Foundation